Samuel Davies (November 3, 1723 – February 4, 1761) was an evangelist and Presbyterian minister. Davies ministered in Hanover County from 1748 to 1759, followed by a term as the fourth President of Princeton University, then known as the College of New Jersey, from 1759 to 1761. Davies was one of the first non-Anglican preachers in Virginia, and one of earliest missionaries to slaves in the Thirteen Colonies. He was a strong advocate for religious freedom, and helped to institute significant religious reforms in the colony. Davies was also a prolific writer, authoring several hymns and publishing a book of poetry.

Early life 
Davies was born in New Castle County, Delaware, to David Davies and Martha Thomas Davies, Baptists of Welsh descent. Davies's mother eventually became a follower of Presbyterian doctrine, which led to his earliest exposure to Calvinist theology. A child of deeply religious parents, his mother named him after the prophet Samuel. The Davies family could not afford to send their son to college, so they instead sent him to receive his early education under the tutelage of Rev. Samuel Blair at the academy he conducted in Faggs Manor, Pennsylvania. Blair's son, also named Samuel, was a member of Princeton's graduating class of 1760, the final class over which Davies presided as school president. The younger Blair later became the second chaplain of the United States House of Representatives.

Career in the ministry

Virginia Evangelist
After Davies completed his studies with Blair, the Presbytery of New Castle licensed him to preach in 1746. He joined the New Side synod of New York, and married Sarah Kirkpatrick on October 23, 1746, while he was preaching in Pennsylvania and Delaware.

Commissioned as an evangelist to Virginia several months later, on February 17, 1747, the 23 year old traveled south to minister to religious dissenters against the Anglican Church. Virginia's colonial legislature in 1743 had licensed Polegreen reading room and three others in and near Hanover County, Virginia. Davies eventually led seven congregations in five counties, fulfilling his duties despite frail health from tuberculosis. His beloved wife Sarah also died from a miscarriage on September 15, 1747, shortly before their first anniversary. Her death led Davies to believe that he too was near death, and he therefore threw himself wholeheartedly into his preaching ministry.

Davies eventually recovered his health and continued to preach. Young Patrick Henry attended many of Davies' sermons with his mother and acknowledged that as the source of his own oratorical skills; others called Davies without peer in the pulpit during his lifetime. Davies returned to Virginia in May 1748, and on October 4, 1748, married Jane Holt, from a prominent Williamsburg family. He fathered six children with Jane, including one child who died at birth.

As one of the first non-Anglican ministers licensed to preach in Virginia (with the now-dead Francis Makemie), Davies advanced the cause of religious and civil liberty in his era. Davies' strong religious convictions led him to value the "freeborn mind" and the inalienable "liberty of conscience" that the established Anglican Church in Virginia often failed to respect. Davies helped found the Presbytery of Hanover, encompassing all Presbyterian ministers in Virginia and North Carolina. He served as its first moderator and was considered the region's leading voice for religious dissenters. By appealing to British law and notions of British liberty, Davies agitated in an agreeable and effective manner for greater religious tolerance and laid the groundwork for the ultimate separation of church and state in Virginia that was consummated after his departure by the Virginia Declaration of Rights in 1776 and the Statute for Religious Freedom in 1786. Rev. Davies also served as the first minister at Providence Presbyterian Church in Louisa County, Virginia until his departure for New Jersey in 1759.

Evangelism of slaves 
Davies advocated educating slaves, including teaching them to read. Unlike Baptist and Methodist evangelists, who based conversion solely on an outpouring of the spirit, Davies believed that no one, regardless of race or social status, can have true religion without both hearing and reading the Word of God. Although personally not opposed to slavery, Davies believed that slaves deserved direct access to the word of God the same as their masters. He was strong believer in the spiritual equality of slaves, although he is known to have owned at least two slaves during his time in Virginia. He justified this activity by presenting himself as a benevolent master. This attitude was consistent with Presbyterian doctrine at the time, which stated that slavery was a political matter, not a church matter. During a 1755 sermon Davies made the following statement to the slaves in attendance at the worship service:

You know I have shewn a tender concern for your welfare, ever since I have been in the colony: and you may ask my own negroes whether I treat them kindly or no."

Slaves became a particular focus of his ministry, and several contemporaries noted how Davies converted African slaves at unusually high numbers. Davies used the educational materials he received from his sponsors in London to instruct slaves, and also composed his own hymns. The classic spiritual "Lord, I want to be a Christian" reportedly originated at Polegreen. Rev. Davies eventually baptized hundreds of slaves as Christians, and they joined other members of the congregation at the communion table. His congregations allowed slaves to preach in the Church. Davies estimated that he ministered to over a thousand black people during his time in Virginia.

As Davies began his ministry in Virginia, six students began studies in Elizabeth, N.J., at the College of New Jersey, which had been established in 1746 to educate "those of every Religious Denomination." In 1753 the college's trustees persuaded Davies, famed for his work in Virginia, to make the dangerous voyage to Great Britain to raise money for the fledgling school. Davies confided the sometimes harrowing journey to his diary, writing "To be instrumental of laying a foundation of extensive benefit to mankind, not only in the present but in future generations, is a most animating prospect." Rev. Davies and a fellow Presbyterian minister, Gilbert Tennent spent eleven months in Great Britain, with Davies preaching sixty times. The two raised substantial sums, mainly through church collections. The grandson of Oliver Cromwell gave three guineas to support their efforts. Davies and Tennent eventually raised a total of four thousand pounds on behalf of the College of New Jersey (over $230,000 today 390.32 "$5,390.32 in 1746 → $232,834.81 in 2017.") www.in2013dollars.com. Retrieved December 7, 2017.</ref> enough to build Nassau Hall as the first permanent building on the new campus in Princeton.<ref name=tracts>"Samuel Davies (1724-1761)." www.tracts.ukgo.com. Retrieved May 14, 2012.</ref>

After his return from Great Britain, Davies's prominence in Virginia grew during the French and Indian War. Governor Dinwiddie declared Davies to be the colony's best recruiter, as he implored men to do their part "to secure the inestimable blessings of liberty.".

In 1759, four years after Davies returned from his British fundraising tour, the College's trustees called on him again, this time asking him to become the school's fourth president. Davies initially declined their offer, thinking that trustee Samuel Finley was better qualified. Eventually Davies accepted the job, and succeeded Jonathan Edwards, who had died just six weeks after his inauguration. David Cowell, a Princeton trustee who had served as acting president of the college from 1757-1758, conducted the negotiations that led to Davies accepting the position. Davies held Cowell in high regard, saying that he performed his duties with a great deal of "zeal, diligence and alacrity."

Final sermon and death
Davies's own term as president also proved short—he died in 1761 at the age of 37. His final published sermon was entitled "A Sermon on the New Year,"  delivered at Princeton on New Year's Day, 1761. Davies, eerily, preached using Jeremiah 28:16 as his reference text, proclaiming that "it is not only possible--but highly probable, that death may meet some of us within the compass of this year." Almost prophetically, Davies died one month later from pneumonia, on February 4, 1761. Rev. Finley succeeded him as the school's president, and Davies was buried alongside his predecessor in Princeton Cemetery.

 Legacy 

 Preacher and orator 
Davies accomplished much despite his relatively short life, and lived the creed to which he exhorted the Princeton Class of 1760, in his baccalaureate address, which has been echoed by the presidents of Princeton throughout its history: "Whatever be your place, imbibe and cherish a public spirit. Serve your generation." Samuel Davies was one of the major contributors to the Great Awakening, a series of religious revivals which eventually caused America to break away from the Church of England. Davies' rhetorical gifts were renowned, and among the many people influenced by him was the orator Patrick Henry. Henry was taken to listen to many of Davies' sermons as a young boy, often reciting portions of them aloud at his mother's request. He would later claim that Davies had the "most profound influence" on him, and considered him to be the greatest speaker he had ever heard.

Davies took his preaching very seriously, and believed that sermons should be delivered "with a grave and affectionate solemnity." 
A contemporary and friend, minister David Bostwick said that Davies' sermons were "adapted to pierce the conscience and affect the heart," while William Buell Sprague noted that "he spoke with a glowing zeal...and an eloquence more impressive and effective than had then ever graced the American pulpit." Davies' sermons went through several editions in the United States and England, and for fifty years after his death they were among the most widely read in the English language. The first five volumes of sermons were printed in London from 1767 to 1771, and the best known American edition is three-volume set, which appeared in New York in 1851.

 Songwriter and poet 
Musicologists credit Davies with being the first American-born hymn writer. Davies followed the lines of Isaac Watts, and while his verses are considered "solid, but somewhat dry and heavy," several of his hymns maintained popularity in American hymnals into the twentieth century. Two of his most popular hymns are "Eternal Spirit, Source of Light," and "Great God of wonders, all Thy ways." In 1752, Davies had a collection of his poems published in Williamsburg, titled Miscellaneous Poems, Chiefly on Divine Subjects.'' Davies' poems were written in the meditative style of Edward Taylor, although his attempts at putting "sublime evangelical rhetoric into couplet form" produced writing that had a "cramped" style.

Educator and evangelist 
Even before becoming president of Princeton Davies proved to be highly beneficial to the university. In addition to raising money to build Nassau Hall, Davies received funding from Great Britain in order to build a house for the school's president, and to start a charitable fund to educate young people. Upon his selection as president one trustee wrote to another "I believe there was never a College happier in a president. You can hardly conceive what prodigious, uncommon gifts the God of Heaven had bestowed on that man." While serving as the school's president, Davies drew up the first catalog of the university library, 1,281 books in all.  Davies' efforts to evangelize slaves in Virginia has come to be called "the first sustained proselytization of slaves" in that colony, earning him scholarly attention into the present day.

Archival collections
The Presbyterian Historical Society in Philadelphia, Pennsylvania, has a collection of Davies' personal papers, including correspondence with Rev. David Cowel, manuscripts of his sermons and a manuscript for one of Davies' published works.

See also
Presbyterianism
Slavery in Virginia

References

External links
Encyclopedia Virginia 
This Day in Presbyterian History

1723 births
1761 deaths
American evangelicals
American evangelists
American Protestant hymnwriters
American people of Welsh descent
American male poets
American slave owners
American Presbyterian ministers
Calvinist and Reformed hymnwriters
People from Hanover County, Virginia
People from New Castle County, Delaware
Presidents of Princeton University
People of colonial Delaware
18th-century American poets
18th-century American male writers
Poets from Delaware
Poets from Virginia
Songwriters from Virginia
Songwriters from Delaware
Deaths from pneumonia in New Jersey
Burials at Princeton Cemetery
American male non-fiction writers
18th-century American clergy